Lahore–Kasur Road (Punjabi), also known locally as Ferozepur Road (Punjabi, Sarak-e-Ferozepur), is a provincially maintained road in Punjab that extends from Lahore to Kasur. Within Lahore (from Mozang Chungi to Gajjumata) it is referred to as Ferozepur Road, since it was initially connected Lahore and Ferozpur in East Punjab.

References

Highways in Punjab
Roads in Punjab, Pakistan
Lahore District